Zemitrella is a genus of sea snails, marine gastropod mollusks in the family Columbellidae, the dove snails.

Species
Species within the genus Zemitrella include:

 Zemitrella spengleri Lussi, 2009

References

Columbellidae
Monotypic gastropod genera